Mutt is an unincorporated community in Nottoway County, Virginia, United States.

References 

Unincorporated communities in Virginia
Unincorporated communities in Nottoway County, Virginia